is a private women's college in Ichikawa, Chiba, Japan. The predecessor of the school was founded in 1897, and it was chartered as a university in 1949.

External links
  

 
Educational institutions established in 1897
Private universities and colleges in Japan
Women's universities and colleges in Japan
1897 establishments in Japan
Ichikawa, Chiba